Miss USA 1961 was the 10th Miss USA pageant, held in Miami Beach, Florida on July 13, 1961. The pageant was won by Sharon Brown of Louisiana, who was crowned by outgoing titleholder Linda Bement of Utah.  Brown's win gave Louisiana a second title in four years, marking the first time a state had won two Miss USA titles outright (Utah had two titleholders in 1957 and 1960, but Charlotte Sheffield in 1957 originally placed 1st runner-up, and inherited the crown after the disqualification of the winner).  Two days after her victory, Brown went on to place as 4th runner-up at Miss Universe 1961.

Results

Historical significance 
 Louisiana wins competition for the second time. 
 California earns the 1st runner-up position for the first time and reaches the highest placement since Terry Huntingdon won in 1959.
 Nevada earns the 2nd runner-up position for the second time. The last time it placed this was in 1957.
 New York earns the 3rd runner-up position for the first time. 
 Alabama earns the 4th runner-up position for the first time.
 States that placed in semifinals the previous year were Alabama, California, Connecticut, Louisiana, Massachusetts, Michigan, New York, New Jersey, Utah and West Virginia.
 California and New York placed for the fifth consecutive year. 
 Alabama and Louisiana placed for the fourth consecutive year. 
 West Virginia placed for the third consecutive year. 
 Connecticut, Massachusetts, Michigan, New Jersey and Utah made their second consecutive placement.
 Nevada last placed in 1959.
 Nebraska last placed in 1958.
 Kentucky last placed in 1953.
 Mississippi and Rhode Island placed for the first time.
 Iowa and Missouri break an ongoing streak of placements since 1959.
 Florida breaks an ongoing streak of placements since 1958.

Delegates
The Miss USA 1961 delegates were:

 Alabama – Suellen Robinson
 Alaska – Judy Onstad
 Arizona – Shyrle Owens
 Arkansas – Mickey Lambert
 California – Pamela Stettler
 Connecticut – Florence Mayette
 Delaware – Nina Lou Ringler
 District of Columbia – Patricia Brunette
 Florida – Peggy DeFreitas
 Georgia – Patsy Giddens
 Idaho – Delcene Rossiter
 Illinois – Dianne Duffey
 Indiana – Janice Oliver
 Iowa – Deanne Ostermann
 Kansas – Dixie Lee Cook
 Kentucky – Marcia Chumbler
 Louisiana – Sharon Brown
 Maine – Barbara Dyer
 Maryland – Gail Baxter
 Massachusetts – Elaine Cusick
 Michigan – Patricia Squires
 Mississippi – Marlene Britsch
 Missouri – Joan Roberts
 Nebraska – Gail Weinstock
 Nevada – Karen Weller
 New Hampshire – Ellen Lipson
 New Jersey – Diane Gierson
 New Mexico – Georgi Edwards
 New York – Alexa Currey
 North Carolina – Marie Clyburn
 Ohio – Alice Englemann
 Pennsylvania – Gayle Nelson
 Rhode Island – Joan Zeller
 South Carolina – Yvonne Quick
 South Dakota – Sharon Hoffman
 Tennessee – Anita Atkins
 Texas – Sheila Wade
 Utah – Janet Hawley
 Vermont – Susan Nielsen
 Virginia – Bonnie Jones
 West Virginia – Kathy McManaway
 Wisconsin – Karen Reisweber
 Wyoming – Judy Walton

No state delegate sent: Colorado, Hawaii, Minnesota, Montana, North Dakota, Oklahoma, Oregon, Washington

External links 
 

1961
1961 in the United States
1961 beauty pageants